Veitchia filifera is a species of flowering plant in the family Arecaceae. It is found only in Fiji.

References

filifera
Endemic flora of Fiji
Data deficient plants
Taxonomy articles created by Polbot